Grigadale (Scottish Gaelic: Griogadal), in Ardnamurchan in the Highland Council Area, Scotland, is the most westerly settlement on mainland Britain.

See also
Extreme points of Scotland

Populated places in Lochaber
Ardnamurchan